B. Darvill's Wild West Show is the 1999 debut album by Son of Dave. This album was re-released at the end of 2008 by Kartel records.

Track listing
Intro – 0:42
Only The Strong Survive – 4:32
Give It Up Old Joe – 2:55
In Love With The Future – 4:58
Bad As Can Be – 3:45
You Makum' Fun Of Me – 3:30
Another Pretty Love Song – 3:38
Back From The USA – 2:49
Lie Down In A Canyon – 2:38
Satan B. Gone – 2:51

1999 debut albums
Son of Dave albums